Araya Rasdjarmrearnsook (born 1957) is a Thai artist who works primarily with film and video. She currently lives in Chiang Mai, Thailand.

Early life and education

Araya Rasdjarmrearnsook was born in Trat, Thailand, in 1957.

She received a Fine Art degree from Silpakorn University, Bangkok, in 1986, and Hochschule für Bildende Künste Braunschweig in Germany.

Araya listed the death date of her parents and her grandmother on her curriculum vitae, indicating the importance of including autobiographical and collective experience in her work.

Artworks 
Araya Rasdjarmrearnsook experimented with intaglio printmaking and sculptural installations in the 1980s and 1990s, before starting to focus in on film and video.

Several of her early sculptural installations have been interpreted as speaking to the position of women in Thai society. In Isolated Hands (1992) and Departure of Thai Country Girls (1995), dismembered parts of female-coded bodies are presented in isolation; in the former, a pair of hands rest on a plate of water, and in the latter, pairs of upside-down legs are lined up on a wooden boat. In Isolated Moral Female Object, in a Relationship with a Male Bird II (1995), an isolated woman's head gazes out through a circular frame containing an image of the sky, while a sculptural bird flies freely through the frame.

In the late 1990s and 2000s, Rasdjarmrearnsook began to bring the rituals of the dead into her practice, accompanied by a shift to video work. She created a series of video works dealing with human corpses. This involved her filming her own rituals for the dead at morgues, in collaboration with the medical community. This includes works like A Walk (1996, 2003), Reading for Corpses, (2002), Chant for Female Corpse (2001, 2002), Sudsiri and Araya (2002), I'm Living (2003), Wind Princess, White Birds (2006), the Conversation series (2005) and The Class series (2005). In The Class (2005), for example, she gives a tutorial to six corpses who are lined up in morgue trays.

In her series Two Planets (2008) and Village and Elsewhere (2011), Rasdjarmrearnsook looked at the interactions between viewers and artworks when placing reproductions of iconic Western paintings in rural areas in Thailand. In Two Planets (2007–08), a group of locals in a Thai countryside are presented with reproductions of 19th-century European paintings. They sit with their backs to the camera and their unpretentious reflections on the artworks are subtitled in English.

Rasdjarmrearnsook is well known for her writing as well as for her visual art. The artist has said, "I write and make visual art for my spiritual survival. Both help me approach states of mind that I cannot attain in real life. The difference between writing and making art is a question of process, time and the way both reach the viewers and readers".

Exhibitions

Rasdjarmrearnsook represented Thailand at the 51st Venice Biennale in 2005, and exhibited at dOCUMENTA(13) in Kassel, Germany, in 2012.

In January 2015 her first retrospective in the United States opened at SculptureCenter, New York.

Solo exhibitions 
Rasdjarmrearnsook's solo exhibitions include:
 SculptureCenter, New York (2015)
 National Gallery, Bangkok (1987, 1992, 1994, 1995, and 2002)
 Tensta Konsthall, Stockholm (2003) 
 Bass Museum of Art, Miami Beach (2012) 
 Walters Art Museum, Baltimore (2012)

Group exhibitions 

 2012 dOCUMENTA (13), Kassel
 2012 Phantoms of Asia, San Francisco, United States
 2010 17th Biennale of Sydney, Sydney, Australia
 2006 Gwangju Biennale, Gwangju
 2005 51st Venice Biennale, Venice, Italy
 2004 Carnegie International, Pittsburgh
 2003 8th Istanbul Biennale, Istanbul, Turkey
 1995 1st Johannesburg Biennale, Johannesburg, South Africa

References

External links
Veal, Clare, "Can the Girl be a Thai Woman? Reading the Works of Araya Rasjarmrearnsook from Feminist Perspectives", 4A Centre for Contemporary Asian Art, 2014

Living people
1957 births
Araya Rasdjarmrearnsook